Parnassianism (or Parnassism) was a French literary style that began during the positivist period of the 19th century, occurring after romanticism and prior to symbolism. The style was influenced by the author Théophile Gautier as well as by the philosophical ideas of Arthur Schopenhauer.

Origins and name
The name is derived from the original Parnassian poets' journal, Le Parnasse contemporain, itself named after Mount Parnassus, home of the Muses of Greek mythology. The anthology was first issued in 1866 and again in 1869 and 1876, including poems by Charles Leconte de Lisle, Théodore de Banville, Sully Prudhomme, Stéphane Mallarmé, Paul Verlaine, François Coppée, Nina de Callias, and José María de Heredia. 

The Parnassians were influenced by Théophile Gautier and his doctrine of "art for art's sake". As a reaction to the less-disciplined types of romantic poetry and what they considered the excessive sentimentality and undue social and political activism of Romantic works, the Parnassians strove for exact and faultless workmanship, selecting exotic and (neo-)classical subjects that they treated with rigidity of form and emotional detachment. Elements of this detachment were derived from the philosophical work of Schopenhauer.

The two most characteristic and most long-lasting members of the movement were Heredia and  Leconte de Lisle.

Transnational influences
Despite its French origins, Parnassianism was not restricted to French authors. Perhaps the most idiosyncratic of Parnassians, Olavo Bilac, Alberto de Oliveira's disciple, was an author from Brazil who managed carefully to craft verses and metre while maintaining a strong emotionalism in them. Polish Parnassians included Antoni Lange,  Felicjan Faleński, Cyprian Kamil Norwid and Leopold Staff. A Romanian poet with Parnassian influences was Alexandru Macedonski. Florbela Espanca was a Parnassian Portuguese poet (Larousse), as was Cesário Verde.

British poets such as Andrew Lang, Austin Dobson and Edmund Gosse were sometimes known as "English Parnassians" for their experiments in old (often originally French) forms such as the ballade, the villanelle and the rondeau, taking inspiration from French authors like Banville. Gerard Manley Hopkins used the term Parnassian pejoratively to describe competent but uninspired poetry, “spoken on and from the level of a poet’s mind”. He identified this trend particularly with the work of Alfred Tennyson, citing the poem "Enoch Arden" as an example.
Many prominent Turkish poets of Servet-i Fünun were inspired by Parnassianism such as Tevfik Fikret, Yahya Kemal Beyatlı and Cenap Şahabettin.

See also
 Zutiste

References

Citations

Sources
In France
 Maurice Souriau, Histoire du Parnasse, ed. Spes, 1929
 Louis-Xavier de Ricard, Petits mémoires d'un Parnassien
 Adolphe Racot, Les Parnassiens, introduction and commentaries by M. Pakenham, presented by Louis Forestier, Aux Lettres modernes: collection avant-siècle, 1967.
 Yann Mortelette, Histoire du Parnasse, Paris : Fayard, 2005, 400 p.
 Le Parnasse. Mémoire de la critique, ed. Yann Mortelette, Paris : PUPS, 2006, 444 p.
 André Thérive, Le Parnasse, ed. PAUL-DUVAL, 1929.
 Luc Decaunes, La Poésie parnassienne Anthologie, Seghers, 1977.

In Brazil
 Bilac, Olavo. Complete Works
 CORREIA, Raimundo. 15 poems
 OLIVEIRA, Alberto. 20 sonets

Essays and criticisms
 AZEVEDO, Sanzio de. Parnasianismo na poesia brasileira. Fortaleza: Ceará University, 2000.
 BOSI, Alfredo. An intuição da passagem em um soneto de Raimundo Correia, in --- (org). Leitura de Poesia. São Paulo: Ática, 2003.
 CANDIDO, Antonio. No coração do silêncio. in: ---. Na sala de aula. São Paulo: Ática, 1985.
 CAVALCANTI, Camillo. Fundamentos modernos das Poesias de Alberto de Oliveira, doctoral thesis at Federal University of Rio de Janeiro, 2008.
 FISCHER, Luis Augusto. Parnasianismo brasileiro. Porto Alegre: Catholic University of Rio Grande do Sul, 2003.
 MAGALHÃES Jr., Raymundo. Olavo Bilac. Rio de Janeiro: Americana, 1974.
 MARTINO, Pierre. Parnasse et symbolisme. Armand Colin, 1967. (Parnaso y symbolismo, Ed. Ateneo)

French poetry
Genres of poetry
Literary movements
Symbolism (arts)